Tailored Films is an Irish film and television production company based in Dublin.

About Tailored Films

Tailored Films was founded by Irish National Film School graduates Julianne Forde and Ruth Treacy in 2006. The company has produced three feature films, as well as producing a number of children's television series for the Irish state broadcaster RTE. Whilst their television work is largely aimed at younger audiences, their feature film projects are predominantly based in the horror genre.  Tailored Films' most notable work includes production credits on Stitches (2012) and The Lodgers (2017).

Television productions
Tailored films have produced five children's television series for the Irish state broadcaster, RTE. This work includes the mystery series Miss Mogul, the reality series Life Lessons, two series of the interactive drama Spooky Stakeout (which was later made into a low-budget feature film in 2016), and the 36-part comedy sketch series Tim's Tactical Tips. The company also produced the six-part web series Zombie Bashers in 2010, the winner of the RTE Storyland scheme.

References

Film production companies of Ireland